The Roman Catholic Diocese of Navrongo–Bolgatanga is a diocese located in the cities of Navrongo and Bolgatanga in the Ecclesiastical province of Tamale in Ghana.

History
Apostolic Prefecture of Navrongo and Apostolic Vicariate of Navrongo were predecessors of what is now the Roman Catholic Archdiocese of Tamale.
 April 23, 1956: Name restored as Diocese of Navrongo from the Diocese of Keta and the Diocese of Tamale
 May 30, 1977: Renamed as Diocese of Navrongo–Bolgatanga

Special churches
Sacred Heart Cathedral and Our Lady of Seven Sorrows Minor Basilica

Bishops
 Bishop of Navrongo (Roman rite)
 Bishop Gerard Bertrand, M. Afr. (1957.04.12 – 1973.04.13)
 Bishops of Navrongo–Bolgatanga (Roman rite)
 Bishop Rudolph A. Akanlu (1973.04.13 – 1994.03.14)
 Bishop Lucas Abadamloora (1994.03.14 - 2009 12.23)
 Bishop Alfred Agyenta (2011.04.05 - )

Coadjutor Bishop
Rudolph A. Akanlu  (1972-1973)

See also
Roman Catholicism in Ghana

Sources
 GCatholic.org
 Catholic Hierarchy

Roman Catholic dioceses in Ghana
Dioceses in Ghana
Christian organizations established in 1926
Roman Catholic dioceses and prelatures established in the 20th century
1926 establishments in Gold Coast (British colony)
Roman Catholic Ecclesiastical Province of Tamale